Patrick Still Lives (also known as Patrick Is Still Alive) is a 1980 Italian horror film directed by Mario Landi, and his last film. It is a low-budget unauthorized sequel of the Australian horror Patrick from two years earlier. It is known primarily for its graphic scenes of sex and gore, notably an extremely graphic scene of 
rape, which ended with the victim disembowelled with a poker. The film was shot in the same house later used as main set in Burial Ground: The Nights of Terror.

Synopsis
The film follows events surrounding a young boy named Patrick sent into a coma after a roadside accident and who develops psychic powers with which he is free to commit brutal murders.

Cast 
Sacha Pitoëff as Dr. Herschel
Gianni Dei as Patrick Herschel
Mariangela Giordano as Stella Randolph
Carmen Russo as Sheryl Cough
Paolo Giusti as Mr. Davis
Franco Silva as Lyndon Cough
Andrea Belfiore as Lydia Grant (uncredited)

Production
Mariangela Giordano regretted filming the scene in which she is violated by a floating poker: "This movie is the worst instance of how shocked I was in retrospect by something I'd done on film. That poker scene is so disgusting, so terrible, only Gabriele[Crisanti] could have sweet talked me into actually doing it!". "It took two days to film that scene, and because the poker had to keep thrusting between my legs before it came out of the top of my head, it got more and more painful as we kept going. And it was cold and freezing. I don't know why Gabriele always insisted on making these movies during winter."

References

External links
 
 Patrick Still Lives at Variety Distribution

1980 films
1980s Italian-language films
Italian horror thriller films
Supernatural thriller films
Italian supernatural horror films
1980 horror films
Italian splatter films
1980s exploitation films
Films directed by Mario Landi
Films scored by Berto Pisano
1980s Italian films
Unofficial sequel films